Sunset Park is a neighborhood south of the Historic Downtown of Wilmington, in New Hanover County, North Carolina, United States. It was designated a national historic district on the National Register of Historic Places in 2003.

History
The prize for his submission was $10.00.

The Fidelity Trust & Development Company purchased the  tract on March 9, 1912. The original owner, T.F. Boyd of Hamlet, North Carolina, sold the land for $35,000.00. The Opening Sale of lots in Sunset Park to the public was originally Monday, September 16, 1912. The date was later postponed to Monday, October 7, 1912.

Sunset Park was envisioned by the Fidelity Development & Investment Company as a high-class, planned community with views overlooking the Cape Fear River and picturesque Greenfield Lake. All the city conveniences and modern improvements would be guaranteed by FD&I. Street car service, electric lights, gas, sewers, sidewalks and tree-lined Macadam type roadways and plazas just to name a few. The neighborhood is said to be modeled after that of Ansley Park and Westland Estates in Atlanta, Georgia.

Poem
In the October 5, 1912 edition of The Evening Dispatch was a pen drawing bird's eye view over Sunset Park along with a poem singing its praises.

Beyond the placid waters/Of Greenfield's lovely lake,
There lies as fair a region/As skillful hands can make.

It reaches to the 'Dram Tree',/Made famous long ago;
And many mounds and batt'ries/Its history will show.

Regardless of the prices/It costs to reach the mark,
We'll beautify the landscape/Of lovely Sunset Park.

With granolithic side-walks,/And streets macadamized,
We'll leave all other places/Neglected and despised.

Each man who owns a cottage,/That he can call his own,
Will be a little Monarch/That no one can dethrone.

Each lot will have its sewers,/To take the filth away;
And water-mains to furnish/The folks who come to stay.

The sun will shine in daylight,/Electric lights at dark;
We'll have a Fairy City/At lovely Sunset Park.

To each prospective buyer/We'll offer terms to please,
So that every one may purchase/A home with perfect ease.

No painter can portray it,/His brush would be too dark,
To give the glowing colors/of lovely SUNSET PARK.

Architecture in Sunset Park 
The majority of resources were built from the 1910s to the 1960s and incorporate Queen Anne, Bungalow/American Craftsman, Tudorbethan, Colonial Revival, Cape Cod (house), Ranch-style house, and Commercial building styles of architecture. The earliest houses are scattered along Northern and Central boulevards; 1940 to 1950s Cape Cod and Ranch houses line the cross streets. Architecturally, the earliest designs are Queen Anne style, dating to the early 1910s. The two-story dwellings have hipped or gabled roofs, wraparound porches, corner towers, bay windows, projecting wings, wood or simulated siding, shingles, decorative brickwork, and a wide range of window types.

A large number of homes were built from 1940 to 1943 when the North Carolina Shipbuilding Company expanded its facilities on land intended for Sunset Park homes along the eastern edge of the Cape Fear River.

The movie Blue Velvet had scenes filmed in Sunset Park including the house of Detective John Williams (George Dickerson). Season 9 of Matlock (TV series) had scenes filmed in Sunset Park including Benjamin L. "Ben" Matlock's (Andy Griffith) house.

Gallery

References

External links
 Sunset Park Historic District

Wilmington, North Carolina
Geography of New Hanover County, North Carolina
Historic districts on the National Register of Historic Places in North Carolina
Queen Anne architecture in North Carolina
Tudor Revival architecture in North Carolina
Colonial Revival architecture in North Carolina
National Register of Historic Places in New Hanover County, North Carolina